C is a 2010 novel written by Tom McCarthy. C is McCarthy's third novel and sixth book. The novel was shortlisted for the Booker Prize. Critics were polarized by the work.

Plot
The novel revolves around Serge Carrefax, born in the late 19th century in England. The plot follows his life before and after World War I.

Themes
A major theme in the novel is communication, and the way technology influences the way individuals and societies communicate.

Reception
Jennifer Egan, writing for the New York Times, referred to the novel as fusing "Pynchonesque revelry in signs and codes with the lush psychedelics of William Burroughs". Leo Robson, in a review for the New Statesman, describes the book as "full of familiar delights and familiar tedium". It continues "After a certain point, most sentences go something like this (not a parody): "Everything seems connected: disparate locations twitch and burst into activity like limbs reacting to impulses sent from elsewhere in the body, booms and jibs obeying levers at the far end of a complex set of ropes and cogs and relays."

References

2010 British novels
British historical novels
Novels set in the United Kingdom
Jonathan Cape books
Postmodern novels